Horoera  is a village and rural community in Gisborne District of New Zealand's North Island. It is located east of Te Araroa and north of East Cape, at Horoera Point.

It features the Matahi O Te Tau Marae and meeting house, a tribal meeting place of the Ngāti Porou hapū of Te Whānau a Hunaara. The marae is named after the area's fertility.

The community has traditionally been made up of a group of closely related families, whose life centred around the marae. The area's isolation made life difficult for European settlers, and poverty has forced many local Māori to migrate to larger centres.

In 2017, New Zealand Transport Agency upgraded the Horoera Bridge, giving campervans and other heavy vehicles full access to the East Cape Lighthouse. It replaced a temporary Bailey bridge installed in 2015.

In October 2020, the Government committed $5,756,639 from the Provincial Growth Fund to upgrade the marae and 28 others across the Gisborne District. The funding was expected to create 205 jobs.

References

Populated places in the Gisborne District